Boano language may refer to:

Boano language (Sulawesi) (Bolano)
Boano language (Maluku)